= Rectitis =

Type of rectal inflammation

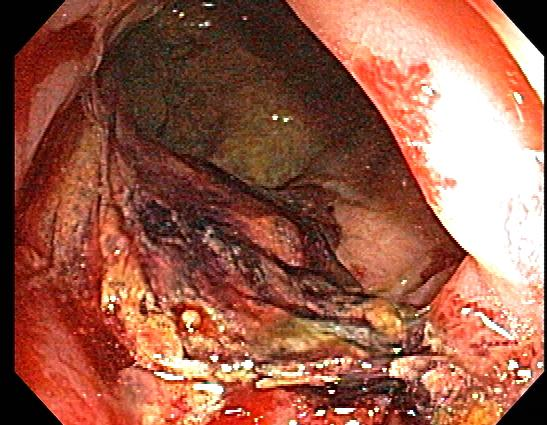
Radiation proctitis3

Rectitis is an inflammation of the inner rectum. It mainly affects the rectal mucous membrane. The condition can be acute or it may be a chronic condition. Rectitis may be caused due to conditions such as ulcerative colitis or Crohn's disease.

== Causes ==
Among the most frequent causes are:

- fungal, bacterial (e.g., induced by syphilis, chlamydia or gonorrhea, with possible discharge of pus) or viral, infections or consequences of traumatic medical procedures such as colonoscopy or an enema done with water that is too hot or an allergenic product such as mesalazine. La pratique de la pénétration anale non protégée est un facteur de risque supplémentaire.
- an iatrogenic origin (medicinal for example; in case of abuse of suppositories containing analgesic products.

== Diagnosis ==
It is based on clinical observation and analysis of surface samples or biopsies (respectively by rectal swabbing and/or rectal biopsy) and may require endoscopic examination, for example, in cases of radiation proctitis.

The possibility of rectal cancer (although rare) should be considered in the presence of ulcerative proctitis with granulation tissue.
